Lloyd Kenneth Smucker (born January 23, 1964) is an American politician serving as the U.S. representative from Pennsylvania's 11th congressional district, which includes Lancaster County and most of southern York County. He is a member of the Republican Party and represented the 16th district until the Supreme Court of Pennsylvania redrew it in 2018 due to gerrymandering. He was a member of the Pennsylvania State Senate for the 13th district from 2009 to 2016.

Biography
Smucker was born in Lancaster County, Pennsylvania, to Daniel and Arie Smucker. At the time of his birth, the family belonged to the Old Order Amish, but they left the community when he was five years old. After graduating from Lancaster Mennonite High School in 1981, he attended Lebanon Valley College and Franklin & Marshall College, where he earned credits in liberal arts but did not complete a degree. For 25 years, he served as president of the Smucker Company, a family-owned commercial construction firm in Smoketown that received $4.83 million in PPP loans in 2020 and 2021 that were subsequently forgiven.

Pennsylvania Senate 
Smucker was a member of the West Lampeter Township Planning Commission for four years before serving two terms as a township supervisor. In 2008, after 23-year incumbent Gib Armstrong decided to retire, Smucker entered the four-way Republican primary to succeed him, receiving 47% of the vote. In the general election, he defeated the Democratic nominee, Lancaster City Council member José E. Urdaneta, 57%-43%.

U.S. House of Representatives

Elections 
On November 8, 2016, Smucker defeated Christina Hartman with 53% of the vote in the race to replace the retiring Joe Pitts in Congress. He was sworn in to represent Pennsylvania's 16th congressional district on January 3, 2017.

A new congressional map imposed by the Pennsylvania Supreme Court renumbered Smucker's district as the 11th district. It picked up the sliver of Lancaster County that had previously been in the 7th district, while losing its shares of Chester and Berks counties. To make up for the loss in population, it was shifted to the west, absorbing most of the more rural eastern portion of York County. The old 16th had been one of Pennsylvania's most Republican districts, but the Democratic trend in areas of the district closer to Philadelphia had resulted in close races at the presidential level since the turn of the millennium. John McCain only carried the old 16th with 51% of the vote in 2008, while Mitt Romney won it with 52% in 2012 and Donald Trump won it with 51% in 2016. According to Nate Cohn of The New York Times, these trends theoretically left Smucker vulnerable in a Democratic wave.

In contrast, the new 11th is significantly more rural and Republican than its predecessor. Had it existed in 2016, Trump would have won it with over 60% of the vote, which would have been his fifth-best showing in the state. According to Cohn, the Republican-controlled state legislature had placed the more Democratic areas of Chester and Berks counties into the 16th in order to protect Republican incumbents in neighboring districts. As Cohn put it, the loss of those areas and the addition of part of York County had the effect of making what was already a "naturally Republican" district even more so.

As expected, Smucker won a second term handily, defeating Democratic nominee Jess King with 59% of the vote.

Tenure
During the presidency of Donald Trump, Smucker voted in line with Trump's stated position 94% of the time. As of September 2021, Smucker had voted in line with Joe Biden's stated position 14.3% of the time.

Smucker supported the American Health Care Act, the GOP's legislation to repeal and replace the Affordable Care Act (Obamacare).

On September 24, 2014, Smucker voted against Pennsylvania senate bill SB1182, which would legalize medical cannabis in Pennsylvania. He voted to repeal provisions in the Dodd-Frank Wall Street Reform and Consumer Protection Act. He has voted for increases in military spending. He supported legislation to punish sanctuary cities. In 2017, Smucker voted for a budget that proposed cutting Medicare by $537 billion and giving seniors the opportunity to enroll in private plans in competition with Medicare.

On January 6, 2021, Smucker voted to overturn the Electoral College results that would make Biden president. Pennsylvania cast its electoral ballots for Biden in the 2020 presidential election.

Political positions

Abortion 
Smucker opposes abortion. He supports including fetuses among those given civil rights protections per the 14th amendment and introduced a bill to protect "infant survivors of abortion".

Racial and LGBT rights 

Smucker opposes gay marriage and voted against federally protecting gay and interracial marriages. He voted against allowing private lawsuits against schools who racially discriminate.

Taxes and federal spending 
Smucker opposes an income tax increase, opposes federal spending, and supports lowering taxes as a means of promoting economic growth.

Education 
Smucker opposes requiring states to adopt federal education standards.

Environment 
Smucker opposes federal regulation of greenhouse gas emissions and assisting rural renewable energy. He voted to loosen restrictions on predator control in Alaska.

Gun control 
Smucker opposes gun-control legislation and voted twice against expanding background checks.

Healthcare 
Smucker supports repealing the Affordable Care Act and supports leaving healthcare to the states.

Immigration 
Smucker supports requiring immigrants who are unlawfully present to return to their country of origin before they are eligible for citizenship and supports bans on immigration for "non-cooperating" countries.

Foreign policy 
Supports increased American intervention in Iraq and Syria beyond air support. He is pro-Israel and supports keeping a US embassy in Jerusalem. He supported Donald Trump's strike on Iranian military leader Qasem Soleimani.

Social security 
Smucker supports allowing individuals to divert a portion of their Social Security taxes into personal retirement accounts.

Donald Trump 
Smucker voted twice against impeaching Trump and against forming the January 6th committee. He was endorsed by Trump in his 2022 reelection bid.

Death penalty 
Smucker supports capital punishment and voted to expand the federal death penalty for killings of police officers.

Net neutrality 
Smucker opposes net neutrality.

Committee assignments 

 Committee on Ways and Means
Subcommittee on Oversight
Subcommittee on Worker and Family Support

Caucus memberships 

 Republican Main Street Partnership 
 Republican Study Committee

References

External links
Congressman Lloyd Smucker official U.S. House website
Lloyd Smucker for Congress official campaign website

 

|-

|-

|-

1964 births
21st-century American politicians
American construction businesspeople
Businesspeople from Lancaster, Pennsylvania
Franklin & Marshall College alumni
Lebanon Valley College alumni
Living people
Politicians from Lancaster, Pennsylvania
Republican Party members of the United States House of Representatives from Pennsylvania
Republican Party Pennsylvania state senators